Doughboy is an unincorporated community in Cherry County, Nebraska, United States.

History
A post office was established at Doughboy in 1919, and remained in operation until it was discontinued in 1934.

References

Unincorporated communities in Cherry County, Nebraska
Unincorporated communities in Nebraska